The Bakersfield Jr. Condors were a USA Hockey-sanctioned Junior A Tier III ice hockey team based out of Bakersfield, California. Their host facility was the Ice Sports Arena Arena. The Jr. Condors were members of the Western States Hockey League and played in the Western Division of the WSHL. The team joined the WSHL as an expansion team for the 2009–10 season along with the Fresno Monsters, Arizona RedHawks, and Idaho Jr. Steelheads. The team would be moved to Ogden, Utah as the Mustangs in 2011.

The players, ages 16–20, carried amateur status under Junior A guidelines and hoped to earn a spot on higher levels of junior ice hockey in the United States and Canada, Canadian Major Junior, Collegiate, and eventually professional teams.

Season-by-season records

References

External links
 Official Team Website
 Official League Website

Ice hockey teams in California